The 2021 Dallas City Council election will determine all 14 city council members in Dallas, Texas. The election occurred on May 1, 2021. By law, Dallas municipal elections are nonpartisan. In races where no candidate took a majority of over 50% of the total vote, the two top vote-earners advanced to a runoff election. Due to term limits, council members are limited to serving four consecutive terms (eight years).

A runoff election for districts 2, 4, 7, 11, 13, and 14 was held on June 5, 2021. Early voting began Monday, May 24, 2021, and ended on Tuesday, June 1, 2021.

Incumbents 

† Denotes Deputy Mayor Pro Tem ‡ Denotes Mayor Pro Tem

Results 
Six of the fourteen races did not have a majority vote for one candidate. The top two vote-earners in these districts advanced to a runoff.

† Denotes New member elected ‡ Denotes incumbent defeated

Candidates 
This section lists persons who have announced their intent to seek election. To appear on the ballot, candidates had to file by February 12, 2021, at 5:00 PM.

District 1

District 2

Withdrawn 

 Jonas Park

Not Qualified 
Rene Yanez

District 3

District 4

District 5

Not Qualified 

 Sarah G. CC Anderson

District 6

District 7

District 8

Not Qualified 
 Melissa Rose Williams

District 9

District 10

District 11

District 12

District 13

District 14

References 

 

Dallas
2021 United States local elections
Dallas municipal elections
Non-partisan elections